Ekam – The Oneness Temple is located at Varadaiahpalem in Tirupati district of Andhra Pradesh, India. It is on the grounds of the ashram of Kalki Bhagavan, a godman who claims to be the final and future avatar of the Hindu deity, Kalki. The temple was inaugurated in April 2006, and built at an estimated cost of $75 million.

Architecture
Built in white marble, the temple is designed with stupas, spires, domes, ornate doors and latticed windows. With its pillar-less meditation halls covering over 22,500 sq feet, largest of such halls in Asia, the temple is a symbol of modern engineering. The temple complex, designed to the Golden Ratio, has a span of 50 metres.

The temple consists of three floors. Each floor is a large meditation hall.  More than 8000 people can meditate together at the same time inside the temple. The halls at the ground and middle level are each a surface area of 6700m2. The hall at the top floor has a surface area of 2500m2. The height of the temple is 32.85 m. The entire temple is built on a raised platform of 130 m by 106 m and surrounded by a moat of water bodies at the four corners. 

The middle floor is called Artha Kama (Hall of desires and solving problems). The top floor is a pillarless meditation hall called Dharma Moksha, housing a solid gold ball of about 36 inches diameter, called the Golden Orb, which sits upon a throne.  

Oneness Temple was designed by Prabhat Poddar (architect from Auroville, Tamil Nadu) based on his studies in architecture, geobiology, and Vaastu Shastra at Sri Aurobindo’s ashram-related International Centre for Education in Puducherry.

The temple is located in a wide open land beside the misty Eastern Ghats mountains.

Controversies and media coverage 
Kalki Bhagwan claimed that in 1995 he had inaugurated the Hindu Golden Age – which was to become realised in 2012 – but the claim was not well-received by the Hindu spiritual establishment. He claimed that by the year 2012, inside the Oneness Temple, there would be between 5,000 and 8,000 people meditating at all times. Subsequently, there was disappointment amongst many of his followers when the prophesies were not fulfilled.  

In October 2019, the temple was raided by Income Tax authorities as part of a large-scale investigation into guru Kalki Bhagwan and his White Lotus organization. 

In 2008, five people died during a stampede at the temple's inauguration, and more than 100 other people were injured in the rush for drinking water. 

During the 1990s, local people organised protests against the owners of the ashram for cheaply buying up hundreds of acres of land from local farmers. Subsequently, some of the farmers had their land returned to them.

There has been media coverage of well-known visitors including Shilpa Shetty, Manisha Koirala, Hrithik Roshan, Rakesh Roshan, designer Donna Karan, musician Rick Allen, and NBA coach Pat Riley.

Travel 
The Oneness Temple is located about 73 km from Chennai and 80 km from Tirupati. Located on the main highway connecting to Kalahasthi, the temple is well connected by bus facilities from Chennai and Tirupathi. The nearest international airport is 75 km in Tirupati. The nearest railway station is 8.7 km away at Tada.

Places of interest nearby
 Chennai (also known as Madras) – Megacity in Tamil Nadu.
 Pulicat Lake Bird Sanctuary – second largest brackish-water eco-system in India.
 Sriharikota – The Indian satellite launch centre.
 Sri City – A special economy zone housing manufacturing plants such as PepsiCo, Isuzu Motors, Mondelez International, and others.
 Tirupati – Temple city where the important Sri Venkateswara Temple is located.

See also
 White Lotus Conglomerate
 Preetha Krishna
 Kalki Bhagawan

References

Hindu temples in Tirupati district
Tirupati district